Elenhank (or Elenhank Designers, Inc.) was a textile design firm. It was started by artist Eleanor Kluck and her husband architect Henry Kluck. They blended their names together to create the company name. They started creating textiles in 1946. Eleanor Kluck designed and cut the lino-cuts that were used. She started working with Henry Kluck in 1948. In the mid-1950s they started to use screen-printing methods. In the 1970s they started designing textiles influenced by Northern Indiana landscapes.

Works by Elenhank are held in the collection of the Cooper-Hewitt, National Design Museum, Art Institute of Chicago, and the Metropolitan Museum of Art.

References

American textile designers
Defunct companies based in Illinois
1946 establishments in the United States